The Viking B-8 Kittyhawk was an American single-engine open-cockpit biplane of the early 1930s.

Development
The Viking B-8 Kittyhawk was developed from the Bourdon B-4 Kittyhawk, 31 examples being built during 1930 and 1931 at Viking's factory in New Haven, Connecticut. Some aircraft were fitted with EDO floats for operation from water.

Operators
The Viking B-8 was flown by private pilot owners and by barnstorming firms who utilised the three-seat layout with a twin-passenger cockpit located ahead of separate pilot's cockpit.

Survivors
In 2015 Viking Kitty Hawk Serial #28 was undergoing restoration to airworthiness following a landing accident in 1973. Viking Kitty Hawk Serial #30 is in storage at New England Air Museum.

Specifications

References

Further reading

External links

1930s United States civil utility aircraft
Biplanes
Single-engined tractor aircraft
Aircraft first flown in 1930